Lambert Harwood Hillyer (July 8, 1893 – July 5, 1969) was an American film director and screenwriter.

Biography
Lambert Harwood Hillyer was born July 8, 1893, in Tyner, Indiana. His mother was character actress Lydia Knott. A graduate of Drake College, he worked as a newspaper reporter and an actor in vaudeville and stock theater. During World War I he began working in motion pictures and became a prolific director and screenwriter, working on many silent-era Westerns by William S. Hart, Buck Jones, Tom Mix and others. 

Often associated with producer Thomas H. Ince, Hillyer expanded into romantic melodramas and crime films in the 1920s. In 1936 he directed two chillers for Universal, the science-fiction film The Invisible Ray and the cult horror film Dracula's Daughter. He directed the first screen depiction of Batman, a 15-part serial produced in 1943 that was re-released as a theatrical feature in 1965. 

He directed many B movies for Columbia Pictures in the 1930s and early 1940s, including the Westerns that were his specialty. Hillyer finished his career directing low-budget dramas and Westerns for Monogram Pictures. In the early days of television, Hillyer also directed episodes of the syndicated Western, The Cisco Kid. Hillyer directed at least one episode of Highway Patrol, which starred Broderick Crawford.

Hillyer died July 5, 1969, in Los Angeles, California.

Filmography

Director

Screenwriter

In addition to writing screenplays for many of the films he directed, as noted above, Hillyer wrote or contributed to the screenplays for these motion pictures.

References

External links

1893 births
1969 deaths
American male screenwriters
Film directors from Indiana
Screenwriters from Indiana
Writers from South Bend, Indiana
20th-century American male writers
20th-century American screenwriters